The Haas–Lilienthal House is a historic building located at 2007 Franklin Street in San Francisco, California, United States, within the Pacific Heights neighborhood. Built in 1886 for William and Bertha Haas, it survived the 1906 San Francisco earthquake and subsequent fire. The house is a San Francisco Designated Landmark and is listed on the U.S. National Register of Historic Places. It is the city's only intact Victorian era home that is open regularly as a museum, complete with period furniture and artifacts. As of 2016, it received over 6,500 visitors annually.

History
 
The House was built for merchant William Haas (brother of Abraham Haas), his wife Bertha Greenebaum, and their children Florine, Charles Williams and Alice. William Haas (1849–1916) was born in Reckendorf, Bavaria from a Jewish family and came to San Francisco in October 1868, rapidly establishing himself as a successful businessman. In 1880 he married Bertha Greenebaum (1861–1927), whose father Herman, owner of a prosperous mercantile company in California, was also from Bavaria. Well integrated within the affluent local Bavarian Jewish community, the couple lived in a number of different residences after their marriage before finally building a grand mansion for themselves and their children. Haas entrusted Bavarian architect Peter R. Schmidt and contractors McCann & Biddell to build his home in 1886.

The house withstood the 1906 earthquake with only slight damage. However, the home was threatened by the devastating fire which followed the earthquake and destroyed about 40% of San Francisco. The Haas family watched the fire from the roof of their house, but was soon forced to evacuate by city authorities. So the family, along with most other San Francisco residents, went to the nearest public park, Lafayette Park, to camp out during the emergency. Three days after the earthquake the fire was finally stopped at Van Ness Avenue, narrowly sparing the house from destruction.

The 1928 addition — living quarters over a garage — were built to provide needed space for the additions to the family when Billy and Madeline were brought to the Haas home. The architect of the addition, Gardner Dailey, later in life received recognition for his work on Ranch-style houses in the Bay Area.

Three generations of Haas and Lilienthal descendants lived at 2007 Franklin Street. In 1972 Alice Haas-Lilienthal died, after having resided in the house for nearly eighty years; the following year, her children donated the mansion to the Foundation for San Francisco's Architectural Heritage (now San Francisco Heritage), a non-profit organization.

The Haas–Lilienthal House was added to the U.S. National Register of Historic Places on July 2, 1973, and designated as a San Francisco Landmark on January 4, 1975. In 2012 it was named a National Treasure by the National Trust for Historic Preservation.

Haas–Lilienthal House Museum
In 1972, the Haas–Lilienthal House was opened to the public for tours. It is the only intact Victorian private home in the city that is open regularly as a museum, complete with original furniture and artifacts. Volunteer docents lead tours of the house which begin in the basement ballroom. The first floor, and the original principal bedchamber, one other bedchamber, a nursery, and one bathroom on the second floor are included in the house tour. The third story, or attic, which contained a spacious redwood-paneled playroom, gym, storage room, and servants’ quarters for the cook and maids, now serve as Heritage offices, as well as the residence of the house manager.

Architecture

The house was built in the Victorian Queen Anne - Eastlake style. Built of redwood, the building follows the locally popular row-house plan, developed to maximise the use of space in deep, narrow hillside lots.

Gallery

See also

 List of San Francisco Designated Landmarks

References

External links

 https://www.haas-lilienthalhouse.org/ (homepage, operated by San Francisco Heritage)

Houses in San Francisco
Historic house museums in California
Museums in San Francisco
Western Addition, San Francisco
Houses completed in 1886
National Register of Historic Places in San Francisco
San Francisco Designated Landmarks
1886 establishments in California
1972 establishments in California
1880s architecture in the United States
Queen Anne architecture in California
Victorian architecture in California
Haas family
Lilienthal family
Houses on the National Register of Historic Places in San Francisco